Francis James Pritchard (6 June 1899 – 16 December 1983) was an Australian rules footballer who played with Carlton in the Victorian Football League (VFL).

The son of William Wilson Pritchard (1864–1942) and Emily Pritchard, nee Robbins (1867–1935), Francis James Pritchard was born at Tatura on 6 June 1899.

He was the father of Geelong player Bill Pritchard.

Notes

External links 

Frank Pritchard's profile at Blueseum

1899 births
1983 deaths
Australian rules footballers from Victoria (Australia)
Carlton Football Club players
Tatura Football Club players